Jawaharlal Nehru Technological University, Kakinada (JNTU Kakinada) is a public university, in Kakinada, East Godavari district, North of the Indian state of Andhra Pradesh. It is one of India's universities focusing on engineering. The university has been accredited by the National Assessment and Accreditation Council (NAAC) of University Grants Commission (UGC) with an "A" grade. JNTU Kakinada is known for its EAMCET entrance test where over 250,000 students take the test every year for around 600 seats in its undergraduate engineering courses. All the selected top candidates for engineering programs enroll at the University College of Engineering (Autonomous) Kakinada.

Academics

The college offers BTech undergraduate and postgraduate degrees in various fields. JNTU Kakinada has established the following schools:

 School of Management Studies
 School of Engineering
 School of  Spatial Information Technology
 School of Health Sciences and  Research
 School of Pharmaceutical Sciences &  Technologies
 School of Renewable Energy &  Environment
 School of Food Technology
 School of Biotechnology
 School of Avionics
 School of  Soft Skills & Public Relations

Admissions 
Admission into BTech is based on EAMCET or ECET ranks; admission into MTech is based on Graduate Aptitude Test in Engineering or PGECET scores; and admission into MCA is based on ICET rank. Students in the state with the highest grades in the above entrance examinations get admission to the college.

Admission into its undergraduate engineering courses is extremely competitive with less than 1% of the students from the Open Category getting selected to study at the University College of Engineering Kakinada, JNTUK through EAMCET entrance examination every year.

Constituent colleges 

JNTU Kakinada has two constituent colleges: University College of Engineering, Kakinada and University College of Engineering, Narasaraopet. On 12 January 2022, the Government of Andhra Pradesh granted university status to JNTUK Vizianagaram and renamed it as Jawaharlal Nehru Technological University - Gurajada, Vizianagaram.

Rankings

University College of Engineering, Kakinada was ranked 97 among engineering colleges by the National Institutional Ranking Framework (NIRF) in 2020.

Notable alumni
Notable alumni include:
Satya N. Atluri, Mechanical Engineering (1959-1963) Padma Bhushan in science and engineering, 2013
E. Sreedharan, Padma Vibhushan 
B. V. R. Mohan Reddy, CEO Cyient

References

External links 

 

Engineering colleges in Andhra Pradesh
All India Council for Technical Education
Education in Kakinada
1946 establishments in India
Educational institutions established in 1946
Jawaharlal Nehru Technological University
State universities in Andhra Pradesh